Franky De Groote (born 28 June 1959) is a Belgian backstroke and medley swimmer. He competed in three events at the 1980 Summer Olympics.

References

External links
 

1959 births
Living people
Belgian male breaststroke swimmers
Belgian male medley swimmers
Olympic swimmers of Belgium
Swimmers at the 1980 Summer Olympics
Sportspeople from Ostend